Arára is a Cariban language of Pará, Brazil. It is spoken by the Arara and perhaps other related groups.

Arára forms part of the Kampot dialect cluster along with Ikpeng, Apiaká do Tocantins, Parirí, and Yarumá.

Phonology

Consonants 

Two of the sixteen consonants, /ʙ̥, h/ occur infrequently. /ʙ̥/ only occurs in expressive words, or before the vowel /u/. /h/ only occurs after a coronal consonant, like /a/ or /u/.

Vowels

Area

The language is spoken by a people which includes groups that are still uncontacted. They live mainly in three villages: Cachoeira Seca, Laranjal and Maia. However, the natives of the latter have switched to Portuguese, while 85 speakers still remain in Cachoeira Seca and 250 in Laranjal.

Animal talk

Linguist Isaac Costa de Souza studied the language and concluded some words were modified when used to talk to different animals. The table below shows some modified words used when speaking to a capuchin monkey.

Different modifications are used according to the species of animal being addressed. The word ikpa, for example, might be modified as tɔkpa when addressing a dog, or as ĩkpã when addressing a howler monkey. Specific modifications may be used when talking to woodpeckers, tortoises, and coatis, among other animals.

References

External links

Languages of Brazil
Cariban languages